Antagonistic contradiction (Chinese language: 矛盾) is the notion that compromise between different social classes is impossible, and their relations must be of class struggle. The term is most often applied in Maoist theory, which holds that differences between the two primary classes, the working class/proletariat and the bourgeoisie are so great that there is no way to bring about a reconciliation of their views. Because the groups involved have diametrically opposed concerns, their objectives are so dissimilar and contradictory that no mutually acceptable resolution can be found. Nonantagonistic contradictions may be resolved through mere debate, but antagonistic contradictions can only be resolved through struggle.

The term is usually attributed to Vladimir Lenin, although he may never have actually used the term in any of his written works.

In Maoism, the antagonistic contradiction was usually that between the peasantry and the landowning class. Mao Zedong expressed his views on the policy in his famous February 1957 speech "On the Correct Handling of Contradictions Among the People."

The Chinese term derives from the Han Feizi: "There was once a man in the state of Chu, who was selling shields and lances. He was praising them saying: “My shields are so firm, that there is nothing that can pierce them.” He praised his lances saying: “My lances are so sharp, that there is nothing that they cannot pierce.” Someone asked: “What if you used your lances to pierce your shields?” The man could not answer. A shield that cannot be pierced and a lance that can pierce everything cannot exist in the same world." (see: Irresistible force paradox)

See also
 On Contradiction
 One Divides Into Two

References
Kim, Samuel S. (1979). China, the United Nations, and World Order. Princeton, NJ: Princeton UP.
Meisner, Maurice (1986). Mao's China and After (Rev. ed.). New York: Free Press. .
Short, Philip (1999). Mao: A Life. New York: Henry Holt.

External links
 Mao Zedong: On Contradiction on the Marxists Internet Archive
 Mao Zedong: On the Correct Handling of Contradictions among the People on the Marxists Internet Archive
 Marxist Philosophy: Antagonistic Contradictions
 Chinese Communist Party: Theory of "Combine Two into One" is a Reactionary Philosophy

Ideology of the Chinese Communist Party
Maoism
Marxism
Maoist terminology